Hutauruk is a Batak Toba surname. It may refer to: 

 Berlian Hutauruk (born 1957), Indonesian singer
 Syarfi Hutauruk (born 1959), Sibolga Mayor
 Bornok Hutauruk (born 1955), Indonesian singer
 Allah Hutauruk (born 1969), Indonesian musician